Call2Recycle is a rechargeable battery and cellphone collection program.

History 
The program launched in the U.S. in 1996 (1997 in Canada) as Charge Up to Recycle! to collect and recycle Nickel Cadmium (Ni-Cd) batteries. In 2001, the program expanded to include all consumer rechargeable batteries, adding Nickel Metal Hydride (Ni-MH), Lithium Ion (Li-Ion), and Small Sealed Lead Acid (SSLA/Pb). It was renamed Call2Recycle in 2004 to reflect the program's expanded focus to also collect cellphones, which contain rechargeable batteries. In 2008, Call2Recycle added a fifth chemistry, Nickel Zinc (Ni-Zn), to its collection program. In 2009, it became the first battery program to receive e-Stewards recognition  by the Basel Action Network (BAN) which ensures that waste is not exported to developing countries. In 2012, the program became the first of its kind to receive Responsible Recycling (R2) certification.

See also
Electronic waste
Recycling in Canada
Recycling in the United States

References

External links
 Call2Recycle
 Call2Recycle Canada
 Portable Rechargeable Battery Association (PRBA)
 Environmental Protection Agency (EPA)
 Battery Council International 
 Electronic Industries Alliance
 European Portable Battery Association (EPBA)
 National Electrical Manufacturers Association (NEMA)

Battery recycling
Recycling in the United States
Recycling in Canada